Highway 239 (AR 239, Hwy. 239) is the name of three state highways in Mississippi County.

Route description

Osceola
Section 0 of Highway 239 is a  state highway near Osceola. AR 239 begins at an intersection with AR 325 south of Osceola and heads east first crossing railroad tracks at-grade then a three-way intersection. AR 239 turns north at this intersection into Osceola. Just inside the city limits, state maintenance ends and the road continues as Chestnut Street.

Blytheville
Sections 1 and 2 of Highway 239 are two state highways totaling - one that runs from Clear Lake to AR 18 in Blytheville and another segment from AR 18 west of Blytheville to AR 181 north of Dell. Starting from AR 148, it heads due north towards Blytheville. The highway enters the city limits as it crosses over I-55. Its name becomes South Ruddle Road as it passes the AR 312 / East Sawyer Street intersection. It intersects the western terminus of AR 239S and a railroad before ending at AR 18 / East Main Street. The overlap with AR 18/AR 151 west through downtown Blytheville is not signed. Continuing west, Highway 151 breaks from the overlap to the north, with AR 239 splitting west at the Blytheville city limits. The route heads west for about  before making a sharp left turn towards the south then gradually curves back to the west. It ends at AR 181 at Half Moon.

Major intersections
Mile markers reset at some concurrencies.

Spur route

Highway 239 Spur (AR 239S) is a spur route in Blytheville.

References

External links

239
Transportation in Mississippi County, Arkansas